Safarşa (also, Səfərşa, Safarcha, and Safarsha) is a village in the Jabrayil Rayon of Azerbaijan. On 20 October 2020 President of Azerbaijan Ilham Aliyev claimed that the village had been captured from the Republic of Artsakh by Azerbaijani forces, though this has not yet been corroborated by third-party sources.

References 

Populated places in Jabrayil District